Michael Henry Dunkley, JP, MP (born June 18, 1957) is a Bermudian politician and businessman who served as the 12th Premier of Bermuda from 2014 to 2017. He was an MP and member general of the One Bermuda Alliance political party and an active businessman on the island.

Dunkley served as Premier of Bermuda until his party, the One Bermuda Alliance (OBA), was defeated in a landslide victory for the Progressive Labour Party (PLP) on 18 July 2017. Dunkley resigned as leader of the OBA on 19 July 2017.

Early life and education
Dunkley is the son of Henry "Bill" Harlow Dunkley (1929–1974) and Marye Lee Dunkley (née O'Dea). He was educated at Saltus Grammar School in Bermuda, Trinity College School in Port Hope, Ontario, Canada, and graduated from University of Richmond and George Washington University in 1980.

He first entered politics in 1997 with his election to The House of Assembly in Bermuda. On December 17, 2012, the One Bermuda Alliance won the general election and Dunkley was appointed the Deputy Premier and Minister of Public Safety. He has been often recognized by the Best of Bermuda Gold Awards published by the Bermudian Magazine for his work in politics and in 2007 was voted "Most Effective Politician."

As a businessman he is Vice President and Chief Executive Officer of Dunkley's Dairy, a milk processing plant and one of the island's largest food importers. Vice President of Island Properties Ltd, a property management company and is President of Dunkley's Management Holdings Ltd, a management consultant company.

On 19 July 2017, Michael Dunkley resigned as leader of the One Bermuda Alliance party, after having called a snap election and losing the election.

Personal life
On 23 May 1982, he married Pamela and had 2 daughters (Christine and Brooke) with her.  They also have a family French Bulldog named Coconut, who has over 1,000 Instagram followers.

References

1957 births
Living people
Premiers of Bermuda
Deputy Premiers of Bermuda
Leaders of the Opposition (Bermuda)
Bermudian businesspeople
One Bermuda Alliance politicians
George Washington University alumni
University of Richmond alumni